Farges-Allichamps is a commune in the Cher department in the Centre-Val de Loire region of France.

Geography
The A71 autoroute runs through the centre of the commune’s territory. The village is one of six with a claim to be the geographic centre of France.

Population

Sights
 The twelfth-century church of St. Jean.
 The feudal castle de La Commanderie.
The chateau of La Brosse, dating from the thirteenth century.

See also
Communes of the Cher department

References

External links

Website of Farges-Allichamps  

Communes of Cher (department)